The 2021 SABA Championship was the 8th SABA Championship, and also known as Bangabandhu 6th South Asian Basketball Championship. The games were held from 15 to 19 November in Dhaka, Bangladesh. Aside from the host country, other confirmed participants are from India, Sri Lanka and Maldives.

 swept the tournament en route to their sixth overall subzone title and their first title after four years.

FIBA Rankings
Here are the FIBA Rankings of the participating teams prior to the start of the tournament (rankings as of 9 August 2021):

 - 78th (World Rank), 14th (Asian Rank)
 - 132nd (World Rank), 28th (Asian Rank)
 - 142nd (World Rank), 31st (Asian Rank)
 - 146th (World Rank), 33rd (Asian Rank)

Standings

Results
All times are in Bangladesh Standard Time (UTC+06:00)

Final rankings

Awards

References

2021
2021 in Bangladeshi sport
Basketball in Bangladesh